Stuart A. Aaronson, M.D. (born February 28, 1942) is an American author and internationally recognized cancer biologist. He has authored more than 500 publications and holds over 50 patents, and was the Jane B. and Jack R. Aron Professor of Neoplastic Diseases and Chairman of Oncological Sciences at The Mount Sinai Hospital in New York City until March 2013, when he assumed the title of Founding Chair Emeritus of the Department of Oncological Sciences. The current Chairman of Oncological Sciences is Ramon E. Parsons.

Biography
Aaronson graduated summa cum laude from the University of California, Berkeley, in 1962, with a degree in chemistry. He earned his M.D. from the University of California, San Francisco Medical Center in 1966, and completed a fellowship at the University of Cambridge in England and an internship in medicine at Moffitt Hospital in San Francisco.

In 1967, Aaronson joined the National Institutes of Health as a Senior Staff Fellow. He headed the Molecular Biology Section of the Viral Carcinogenesis Branch from 1970 until 1977, after which he became Chief of the Laboratory of Cellular and Molecular Biology at the National Cancer Institute, until 1993, when he was named Chairman of Oncological Sciences at The Mount Sinai Hospital.

Research
Aaronson's early research established the transformation-competent but replication-defective nature of mammalian sarcoma viruses and molecularly cloned many of their oncogenes. His investigations of the v-sis oncogene established the first normal function of an oncogene and its role in growth factor signaling. His discovery of erbB2 as a v-erbB-related gene amplified in a human breast carcinoma and the demonstration of its transforming properties paved the way for targeted therapies directed against its product, and his successful isolation of KGF (FGF7), a growth factor present in the epithelialization-phase of wound healing, led to Amgen's successful phase III clinical trial and FDA approval of KGF for treatment of mucositis. Current research includes investigations into the mechanisms by which tumor suppressor genes induce permanent growth arrest/senescence, the signaling pathways involved, and investigations of the autocrine and paracrine acting growth factors PDGF, KGF, HGF, and Wnt ligands.  To date 3 papers on which Stuart Aaronson is author have been retracted, and 2 papers on which he is author have received expressions of concern.

Awards and honors
1982	Rhoads Memorial Award
1982	PHS Meritorious Service Medal
1989	Paul Ehrlich Award
1989	PHS Distinguished Service Medal
1990	Milken Award
1991	Chirone Prize
1991	Harvey Lecture
1991	Wadsworth Memorial Foundation Award
2005    FLC Mid-Atlantic Regional Excellence in Technology Transfer Award – Kepivance
2006    National FLC Award for Excellence in Technology Transfer – Kepivance: Improving the Quality of Life for Cancer Patients

Patents
Partial list:

Publications
Partial list:

References

External links
The Mount Sinai Hospital homepage
Icahn School of Medicine at Mount Sinai homepage
Activation of a Cancer Gene by Single Mutation Reported. The New York Times, September 28, 1983
Cancer Gene Linked to Flaws in Growth of an Ordinary Cell. The New York Times, February 10, 1984
The Long Road: Scientists worked for years to unravel Met's role in cancer. Cover story, Chemical & Engineering News, August 20, 2007

https://web.archive.org/web/20120909024225/http://www.science-fraud.org/?tag=sw-lee
 

 

1942 births
Cancer researchers
Living people
Icahn School of Medicine at Mount Sinai faculty
American oncologists
UC Berkeley College of Letters and Science alumni
University of California, San Francisco alumni
People from Mount Clemens, Michigan